The Atakapa  or Atacapa were an indigenous people of the Southeastern Woodlands, who spoke the Atakapa language and historically lived along the Gulf of Mexico in what is now Texas and Louisiana. They included several distinct bands.

Choctaw people used the term Atakapa, which was adopted by European settlers adopted the term. The Atakapa called themselves the Ishak , which translates as "the people." 

Within the Ishak there were two moieties which the Ishak identified as "The Sunrise People" and "The Sunset People". 

After 1762, when Louisiana was transferred to Spain following French defeat in the Seven Years' War, little was written about the Atakapa as a people. Due to a high rate of deaths from infectious epidemics of the late 18th century, they ceased to function as a people. Survivors generally joined the Caddo, Koasati, and other neighboring nations, although they kept some traditions. Some culturally distinct Atakapan descendants survived into the early 20th century.

Name 
Their name was also spelled Attakapa, Attakapas, or Attacapa. The Choctaw used this term, meaning "man-eater", for their practice of ritual cannibalism. Europeans encountered the Choctaw first during their exploration, and adopted their name for this people to the west. The peoples lived in river valleys, along lake shores, and coasts from present-day Vermilion Bay, Louisiana to Galveston Bay, Texas.

Subdivisions or bands 

Atakapa-speaking peoples are called Atakapan, while Atakapa refers to a specific tribe. Atakapa-speaking peoples were divided into bands which were represented by totems, such as snake, alligator, and other natural life.

Eastern Atakapa
The Eastern Atakapa (Hiyekiti Ishak, "Sunrise People") groups lived in present-day Acadiana parishes in southwestern Louisiana and are organized as three major regional bands:
 The Ciwāt or Alligator Band lived along the Vermilion River and near Vermilion Bay in southwestern Iberia Parish and southeastern Vermilion Parish in south central Louisiana. This inlet of the Gulf of Mexico is separated from it by Marsh Island; they also occupied a portion of the Louisiana mainland in southeastern Vermilion Parish. The alligator was very important to this band. In addition to consuming its meat as food, they used its oil for cooking and to treat minor arthritis and eczema symptoms. They used its scales as arrowheads.
 The Otse, Teche Band, or Snake Band lived on the prairies and coastal marshes in the Mermentau River watershed, along the Bayou Nezpique, Bayou des Cannes, and Bayou Plaquemine Brule, containing the freshwater Grand and White lakes, and around St. Martinville on Bayou Teche in present-day St. Martin, Lafayette, St. Landry, St. Mary, Acadia and Evangeline parishes in southern Louisiana. They are named for the snake, which symbolizes the winding and twisting course of Bayou Teche.
 The Tsikip, Appalousa (Opelousa), Opelousas Band ("Blackleg") or Heron Band, painted their lower legs and feet black during mourning ceremonies, mimicking the long black legs of the heron. Before European contact in the 18th century, they lived between the Atchafalaya River and Sabine River (at the present-day border of Texas-Louisiana) to the west of the lower Mississippi River. Later they were centered in the area around present-day Opelousas, Louisiana and the prairies around St. Landry Parish. They were at times associated with the neighboring Eastern Atakapa and Chitimacha peoples. They were warlike and preyed on neighbors to defend their own territory. In 1760 Chief Kinemo of the Eastern Atakapa sold the tribal lands between the Vermilion River and Bayou Teche to Frenchman Gabriel Fuselier de la Claire; the angry Appalousa exterminated the Eastern Atakapa bands for selling off communal lands. The Opelousa Band reportedly spoke the Eastern Atakapan dialect.

Western Atakapa
The Western Atakapa (Hikike Ishak, "Sunset People") resided in southeastern Texas. They were organized as follows.
Atakapa (proper) groups, divided into major regional bands:
 The Katkoc or Eagle Band (named after the eagles in the area), were also known as Calcasieu Band, because they were living along Calcasieu River between the Calcasieu Lake in southwest Louisiana and Sabine Lake on the Louisiana-Texas border.
 The Red Bird Band, lived on the prairies and coastal areas of what is now Cameron Parish, in South Western Louisiana; they were represented by the cardinal or red bird.
 The Niāl or Panther Band, lived in the areas around the Sabine River of South East Texas, they took the panther as their totem.
 The Akokisa, Arkokisa, or Orcoquiza ("river people"), westernmost Atakapa tribe, lived in the mid-18th century in five villages along the lower course of the Trinity and San Jacinto rivers and the northern and eastern shores of Galveston Bay in present-day Texas. In 1805, their surviving people were reported to be living in villages on the lower Colorado and Neches rivers.
The Quasmigdo, better known as Bidai (a Caddo language name meaning "brushwood"), were based around Bedias Creek, ranging from the Brazos River to Neches River, Texas.
The Deadose, a band of Bidai that separated in the early 18th century, lived north of the other Bidai between the confluence of the Angelina River and Neches River and the upper end of Galveston Bay in east-central Texas. Around 1720 they moved westward between the Brazos and Trinity rivers; later they settled near missions on the San Gabriel River (with the Bidai and Akokisa) in the Texas Hill Country. Between 1749 and 1751 they gathered (with the Akokisa, Orcoquiza, Bidai, and Patiri) at the short-lived San Ildefonso Mission near the mouth of Brushy Creek; some settled near the Alamo Mission in San Antonio. In the second half of the 18th century, the Deadose were closely associated with Tonkawan groups (Ervipiame (?), Mayeye, and Yojuane). Suffering high mortality from epidemics of measles and smallpox, survivors joined kindred Bidai, Akokisa and Tonkawa. They lost their distinctive tribal identity in the latter part of the 18th century.
 The Patiri or Petaros lived north of the San Jacinto River valley between the Bidai to the north and the Akokisa in the south of Texas. This places them in the Piney Woods of East Texas, west of the Trinity River in the area between Houston and Huntsville. Little is known about them; perhaps they were a southern Bidai band.
 The Tlacopsel, Acopsel, or Lacopspel — it is believed that they lived in the same general area as the kindred Bidai and Deadose. The location of their settlements in southeast Texas are unknown. They are known only from Spanish documents of the eighteenth century, when they were referred to for requesting missions from the Spanish in east central Texas.

Atakapa language
The Atakapa language was a language isolate, once spoken along the Louisiana and East Texas coast and believed extinct since the mid-20th century. John R. Swanton in 1919 proposed a Tunican language family that would include Atakapa, Tunica, and Chitimacha. Mary Haas later expanded this into the Gulf language family with the addition of the Muskogean languages. As of 2001, linguists generally do not consider these proposed families as proven.

History 

Atakapa oral history says that they originated from the sea. An ancestral prophet laid out the rules of conduct.

The first European contact with the Atakapa may have been in 1528 by survivors of the Spanish Pánfilo de Narváez expedition. These men in Florida had made two barges, in an attempt to sail to Mexico, and these were blown ashore on the Gulf Coast. One group of survivors met the Karankawa, while the other probably landed on Galveston Island. The latter recorded meeting a group who called themselves the Han, who may have been the Akokisa.

18th century 
In 1703, Jean-Baptiste Le Moyne, the French governor of La Louisiane, sent three men to explore the Gulf Coast west of the Mississippi River. The seventh nation they encountered were the Atakapa, who captured, killed and cannibalized one member of their party. In 1714 this tribe was one of 14 that were recorded as coming to Jean-Michel de Lepinay, who was acting French governor of Louisiana between 1717 and 1718, while he was fortifying Dauphin Island, Alabama.

The Choctaw told the French settlers about the "People of the West," who represented subdivisions or tribes. The French referred to them as les sauvages.  The Choctaw used the name Atakapa, meaning "people eater" (hattak 'person', apa 'to eat'), for them. It referred to their practice of ritual cannibalism related to warfare.

A French explorer, Francois Simars de Bellisle, lived among the Atakapa from 1719 to 1721. He described Atakapa feasts including consumption of human flesh, which he observed firsthand. The practice of cannibalism likely had a religious, ritualistic basis. French Jesuit missionaries urged the Atakapa to end this practice.

The French historian Antoine-Simon Le Page du Pratz lived in Louisiana from 1718 to 1734. He wrote:

Louis LeClerc Milfort, a Frenchman who spent 20 years living with and traveling among the Muscogee (Creek), came upon the Atakapa in 1781 during his travels. He wrote:

In 1760, the French Gabriel Fuselier de la Claire came into the Attakapas Territory, and bought all the land between Vermilion River and Bayou Teche from the Eastern Atakapa Chief Kinemo. Shortly after that a rival Indian tribe, the Appalousa (Opelousas), coming from the area between the Atchafalaya and Sabine rivers, exterminated the Eastern Atakapa. They had occupied the area between Atchafalaya River and Bayou Nezpique (Attakapas Territory).

William Byrd Powell (1799–1867), a medical doctor and physiologist, regarded the Atakapan as cannibals. He noted that they traditionally flattened their skulls frontally and not occipitally, a practice opposite to that of neighboring tribes, such as the Natchez Nation.

The Atakapa traded with the Chitimacha tribe. In the early 18th century, some Atakapa married into the Houma tribe of Louisiana. Members of the Tunica-Biloxi tribe joined the Atakapa tribe in the late 18th century.

19th century 
John R. Swanton recorded that only 175 Atakapa lived in Louisiana in 1805.
 It is believed that most Western Atakapa tribes or subdivisions were decimated by the 1850s, mainly from infectious disease and poverty.

20th century 
 In 1908, nine known Atakapa descendants were identified. Armojean Reon (ca. 1873–1925) of Lake Charles, Louisiana, was noted as a fluent Atakapa speaker. In the 1920s, ethnologists Albert Gatshet and John Swanton studied the language and published A Dictionary of the Atakapa Language in 1932.

Culture

The Atakapan ate shellfish and fish.  The women gathered bird eggs, the American lotus (Nelumbo lutea) for its roots and seeds, as well as other wild plants. The men hunted deer, bear, and bison, which provided meat, fat, and hides. The women cultivated varieties of maize.  They processed the meats, bones and skins to prepare food for storage, as well as to make clothing, tent covers, tools, sewing materials, arrow cases, bridles and rigging for horses, and other necessary items for their survival.

The men made their tools for hunting and fishing: bows and arrows, fish spears with bone-tipped points, and flint-tipped spears. They used poisons to catch fish, caught flounder by torchlight, and speared alligators in the eye. The people put alligator oil on exposed skin to repel mosquitoes. The Bidai snared game and trapped animals in cane pens. By 1719, the Atakapan had obtained horses and were hunting bison from horseback. They used dugout canoes to navigate the bayous and close to shore, but did not venture far into the ocean.

In the summer, families moved to the coast. In winters, they moved inland and lived in villages of houses made of pole and thatch. The Bidai lived in bearskin tents. The homes of chiefs and medicine men were erected on earthwork mounds made by several previous cultures including the Mississippian.

Cultural heritage groups 
Different groups claiming to be descendants of the Atakapa have created several organizations, and some have unsuccessfully petitioned Louisiana, Texas, and the United States for status as a recognized tribe. A member of the "Atakapa Indian de Creole Nation," claiming to be trustee, monarch, and deity, filed a number of lawsuits in federal court claiming, among other things, that the governments of Louisiana and the United States seek to "monopolize intergalactic foreign trade." The suits were dismissed as frivolous.

Another group, the Atakapa Ishak Tribe of Southeast Texas and Southwest Louisiana, also called the Atakapa Ishak Nation, based in Lake Charles, Louisiana obtained nonprofit status in 2008 as an "ethnic awareness" organization. They also refer to themselves as the Atakapa-Ishak Nation and met en masse on October 28, 2006. The Atakapas Ishak Nation of Southeast Texas and Southwest Louisiana unsuccessfully petitioned the US federal government for recognition on February 2, 2007.

These organizations are not federally recognized or state-recognized as Native American tribes.

Legacy 
The names of present-day towns in the region can be traced to the Ishak; they are derived both from their language and from French transliteration of the names of their prominent leaders and names of places. The town of Mermentau is a corrupted form of the local chief Nementou. Plaquemine, as in Bayou Plaquemine Brûlée and Plaquemines Parish, is derived from the Atakapa word pikamin, meaning "persimmon". Bayou Nezpiqué was named for an Atakapan who had a tattooed nose. Bayou Queue de Tortue was believed to have been named for Chief Celestine La Tortue of the Atakapas nation. The name Calcasieu is a French transliteration of an Atakapa name: katkosh, for "eagle", and yok, "to cry".

The city of Lafayette, Louisiana, is planning a series of trails, funded by the Federal Highway Administration, to be called the "Atakapa-Ishak Trail". It will consist of a bike trail connecting downtown areas along the bayous Vermilion and Teche, which are now accessible only by foot or boat.

See also
USS Atakapa (ATF-149)
Attakapas Parish

Notes

References
 Newcomb, William Wilmon, Jr. The Indians of Texas: From Prehistoric to Modern Times. Austin: University of Texas Press, 1972. .
 Sturtevant, William C., general editor and Raymond D. Fogelson, volume editor. Handbook of North American Indians: Southeast. Volume 14. Washington DC: Smithsonian Institution, 2004. .
 Nezat, Jack Claude. The Nezat and Allied Families 1630–2007, and The Nezat and Allied Families 1630-2020.   .
 Pritzer, Barry M. A Native American Encyclopedia: History, Culture, and Peoples. Oxford: Oxford University Press, 2000: 286-7. .

External links
Tribes in Louisiana 
Handbook of Texas Online
Atakapa-Ishak Nation

 
Native American history of Louisiana
Native American history of Texas
Native American tribes in Louisiana
Native American tribes in Texas
Unrecognized tribes in the United States